Prince Miller (born January 14, 1988) is a former American football cornerback. He played for the Saskatchewan Roughriders of the Canadian Football League.  He played college football at Georgia.

Early years 
Miller attended James F. Byrnes High School in Duncan, South Carolina, where he played football as a cornerback. He was named team MVP his junior and senior seasons, recording 43 tackles, five interceptions, and three punt returns touchdowns as a junior. As a senior, Miller had four interceptions, three forced fumbles, gained over 2,000 yards total offense, and had 16 total touchdowns and was named an Associated Press South Carolina All-State defensive back. He was named the 2005 South Carolina Mr. Football at the SCADA North-South All-Star game, and played in the 2005 Shrine Bowl of the Carolinas.

Miller was also named Gatorade State Football Player of the Year, the Orlando Sentinel South Carolina Player of the Year, and was named to the Atlanta Journal-Constitutions Super Southern 100. As named to the 2005 FSN South Countdown to Signing Day All-South second-team. He was rated by Rivals.com as the No. 26 best athlete, by ESPN.com as the 11th best cornerback in the nation, and by Scout.com as one of the top 20 cornerback prospects in the country.

College career 
After graduating from high school, Miller attended the University of Georgia. As a true freshman in 2006, Miller played in every game and was named the team's Special Teams Newcomer of the Year, blocking a punt against UAB which was returned for a touchdown by teammate C. J. Byrd. In 2007, Miller appeared in 13 games, making eight starts at cornerback, finishing the season with 24 tackles, one interception, and seven pass break-ups. As a junior in 2008, Miller appeared in 13 games and made 10 starts, recording 50 tackles and returning nine punts for 191 yards and one touchdown, returned 92 yards against Alabama. In 2009, his senior season, Miller was named a special teams captain and started all 13 games, making 42 tackles, including five for a loss, and returning 19 punts for 226 yards.

Professional career

First stint with Ravens 
After going undrafted in the 2010 NFL Draft, Miller signed with the Baltimore Ravens on May 7, 2010. He was waived one day after final cuts by the Ravens on September 5, 2010.

New England Patriots 
The New England Patriots signed Miller to their practice squad on September 7, 2010.

Return to the Ravens 
The Ravens signed Miller off the Patriots' practice squad on September 15, 2010 to their active roster. He was waived on October 5, 2010, and re-signed to their practice squad two days later, October 7, 2010.

Detroit Lions 
The Lions signed Miller off the Ravens' practice squad on December 8, 2010 to their active roster.

Jacksonville Jaguars 
Miller was signed to the Jaguars practice squad on October 18, 2012. He was released on October 30.

Saskatchewan Roughriders 
In 2013, Miller signed with the Saskatchewan Roughriders

References

External links 
Georgia Bulldogs bio

1988 births
Living people
People from Duncan, South Carolina
Players of American football from South Carolina
American football safeties
American football return specialists
Georgia Bulldogs football players
Baltimore Ravens players
New England Patriots players
Detroit Lions players
Indianapolis Colts players
Buffalo Bills players
Jacksonville Jaguars players
Cleveland Browns players